Elias Issa Bandak (c.1911 – 26 April 1972) was the mayor of Bethlehem from 1950–52, 1952–57, and from 1964-72, serving three separate terms. He succeeded his cousin Issa Basil Bandak. Bandak is a Palestinian Christian.

Bandak died of cancer on 26 April 1972, aged 61.

See also
Palestinian Christians

References

Mayors of Bethlehem
Palestinian Christians
Year of birth uncertain
1972 deaths